Sharar Haidar (born 15 August 1971) is a former Iraqi football defender, who played for Iraq in the 1989 FIFA World Youth Championship and 1994 FIFA World Cup qualification. He played for the national team between 1989 and 1992. He was appointed as Al-Karkh chairman in 2003.

Sharar fled Iraq in 1998 and told the media how the players were tortured after losses on orders by Uday Hussein.

References

Iraqi footballers
Iraq international footballers
Living people
1971 births
Association football midfielders